Ying Ge Li Shi may refer to:

English (novel), a 2004 Chinese novel by Wang Gang
English (2018 film), an upcoming Chinese film based on the novel

See also
English (disambiguation)
Chinglish, Chinese-style English